Joe Bash is an American comedy-drama television series that aired on ABC from March 28 to May 10, 1986. Starring Peter Boyle as a weary and embittered New York City Police Department beat cop, it was created by Danny Arnold following his sitcom Barney Miller. The production company was Tetagram Ltd., with Arnold and Chris Hayward serving as the show's executive producers. All six episodes were written by the team of Arnold, Hayward  and Philip Jayson Lasker, with Arnold directing all but the fifth episode, which was directed by John Florea.

Synopsis
A darkly urban comedy-drama shot without a studio audience or laugh track, the series starred Peter Boyle as a veteran, semi-corrupt cop marking time until retirement, and Andrew Rubin as his naive rookie partner, Officer Willie Smith. Series creator Danny Arnold described the lead character as "a beat patrolman with thirty years on the force. He's become so completely disillusioned and such a terrible cynic that he's written off the world." In recurring roles were DeLane Matthews as streetwalker Lorna, the only person with whom the misanthropic Bash could be even somewhat close; Val Bisoglio as Sgt. Carmine DiSalvo; Michael Cavanaugh as Lt. Pendleton; and Larry Hankin as diner-owner Stu. It was set in the 33rd Precinct in Manhattan, represented via a deliberately theatrical set reminiscent of a stage play.

As Arnold described it, "The show came out to be sort of strange. ... ABC said, 'What kind of show is this? We don't know how to sell it.' ... 'Joe Bash' is not a situation comedy and it's not a drama. It's a behavioral comedy, a comedy whose roots are in drama." He chose the name "Bash" because it "sounded like an aggressive hitter, a victim who is striking back and totally cynical because he's accomplished nothing in his life."

Reception
Joe Bash won positive notices from critics. Time placed the series on the magazine's 1986 best-of list, calling it "a moody tragicomedy on loneliness. Peter Boyle was outstanding as a grumpy cop in this undeservedly short-lived series". In an earlier review, the magazine remarked on how the two lead characters would "traverse the desolate city streets and cope with the unglamorous trivia of everyday police life. ... In Boyle's sharp and unsentimental portrayal, crustiness never becomes cute, and there are echoes of authentic urban despair in the patter". The New York Times wrote favorably that, "There is no laugh track to signal the viewer as to whether Joe's misanthropy is really supposed to be funny. Joe Bash moves to its own special beat, apparently bent on demolishing every well-established cliché in sitcom territory". Lee Margulies of the Los Angeles Times wrote that the show is "not entertaining in the usual TV sense, but the intriguing premise and the captivating performance by Boyle nevertheless leaves one interested in tuning in again".

Cast
Peter Boyle as Off. Joe Bash
Andrew Rubin as Off. Willie Smith

Episodes

Other crew
Associate producer: Martin J. Gold
Director of photography: Mike Berlin
Editor: Paul Bonat
Production designer: Ed LaPorta
Music: Jack Elliott
Lighting director: Mark Palius
Casting: Eleanor Ross (Los Angeles), David Tochterman (New York City)
Makeup: Holly Bane
Wardrobe: Barbara Murphy

References

External links

Joe Bash cast and crew at Yahoo!
Episode 4 at YouTube.com

1986 American television series debuts
1986 American television series endings
1980s American comedy-drama television series
American Broadcasting Company original programming
Bash, Joe
Fictional portrayals of the New York City Police Department
Television shows set in New York City
English-language television shows
Television series by Sony Pictures Television